The Cirrus is a German single-place paraglider that was designed and produced by Swing Flugsportgeräte of Landsberied. It is now out of production.

Design and development
The Cirrus was designed as an advanced and cross country glider.

The design progressed through several generations of models, each improving on the last. The models are each named for their approximate projected wing area in square metres.

Variants
Cirrus 3 24
Mid-sized model for lighter pilots. The glider model is Deutscher Hängegleiterverband e.V. (DHV) 2-3 certified.
Cirrus 3 26
Large-sized model for heavy-weight pilots. The glider model is DHV 2-3 certified.

Specifications (Cirrus 3 24)

References

Cirrus
Paragliders